is a private junior college in the city of Ichikawa in Chiba Prefecture, Japan. It was established in 1992.

External links
 Official website 

Japanese junior colleges
Educational institutions established in 1992
Private universities and colleges in Japan
Universities and colleges in Chiba Prefecture
Ichikawa, Chiba
1992 establishments in Japan